Sabine Stuart de Chevalier (fl. 1781) was a French alchemist and writer. She was the author of a work of alchemy, Discours Philosophique sur les Trois Principes, Animal, Vegetal and Mineral ou La Clef du Sanctuaire Philosophique (Paris, 1781).

References 

French alchemists
18th-century French scientists
18th-century French women scientists
18th-century French writers
18th-century alchemists
Year of birth unknown
Year of death unknown